Tappan Historic District is a national historic district located at Tappan in Rockland County, New York.  It encompasses 26 contributing buildings and three contributing sites.  The district consists of 30 properties that reflect the historic commercial and residential core of the late 18th and 19th century village of Tappan.  The Reformed Church of Tappan, The Old 76 House, Borcher's Stable and The Burton Store are located within the district boundaries.

It was listed on the National Register of Historic Places in 1990.

Gallery

References

External links

Historic districts on the National Register of Historic Places in New York (state)
Houses on the National Register of Historic Places in New York (state)
Historic districts in Rockland County, New York
Houses in Rockland County, New York
National Register of Historic Places in Rockland County, New York